Taeniotes parafarinosus is a species of beetle in the family Cerambycidae. It was described by Olivier in 1790. It is known from Peru, Brazil, Costa Rica, Panama, French Guiana, Bolivia, Guyana, and Suriname. It has also been introduced into Guadeloupe.

References

parafarinosus
Beetles described in 1790